David Charles Evans, Baron Evans of Watford (born 30 November 1942) is a British publisher, entrepreneur and philanthropist. As a Member of the House of Lords, he sits as a Labour peer and also holds chairmanships that span across printing, business consultancy, charity and healthcare.

Early life
Evans attended Watford College of Technology and was awarded the Edward Hunter Gold Medal as best student, as well as being awarded Full Technologist qualifications.

Career

Following the sale of Centurion Press, Evans founded Senate Publishing Ltd with his business partner of 21 years, Caroline Minshell. Senate Publishing produces publishing and communication platforms for governments, major corporates and leading financial institutions.

Evans was a Trustee of the Royal Air Force Museum and is a Director of the Royal Air Force Museum Trading Company. He also serves as chairman of the Institute of Collaborative Working.

Evans previously served as Senior Advisor to Ron Wahid, Chairman of Arcanum Global, a global strategic intelligence company and a subsidiary of Magellan Investment Holdings.

Evans was created a life peer on 28 July 1998 taking the title Baron Evans of Watford, of Chipperfield in the County of Hertfordshire.

Other work
In addition to his business successes, Lord Evans is an advocate and supporter of cancer research, becoming joint President of the ‘Pioneers for Prostate Cancer UK’ and supporting other cancer research foundations.

References

External links
DodOnline|
Lord Evans Biography on Senate consulting site

1942 births
Living people
British trade unionists
Evans of Watford
Life peers created by Elizabeth II